The Peckett OQ Class is a class of  steam locomotives built in Bristol, England by Peckett & Sons. Three were built; no. 2124 for Tower Colliery in 1951 and nos. 2150 and 2151 for Mardy Colliery in 1954. No. 2150 has been preserved and is named Mardy Monster. According to Heritage Railway magazine it is "Britain’s most powerful industrial locomotive". This claim may be misleading because it is based on tractive effort rather than horsepower.

Preservation
After being withdrawn in 1976, No. 2150 was preserved by the Swanage Railway in 1979. In 1997 it was purchased by the Elsecar Heritage Railway, returning to service in June 2003. It was withdrawn after its boiler certificate expired in 2013.  Its overhaul was never completed and it was sold in 2020.

References

External links

0-6-0ST locomotives
OQ
Railway locomotives introduced in 1951
Standard gauge steam locomotives of Great Britain